Hot Rollers are an Australian band formed by Richie Lewis (Tumbleweed) and Mark "Kram" Maher (Spiderbait). Their single "Wickerman Shoes" saw them nominated for ARIA Award for Breakthrough Artist – Single.

Discography

Studio albums

Singles

Awards and nominations

ARIA Music Awards
The ARIA Music Awards is an annual awards ceremony that recognises excellence, innovation, and achievement across all genres of Australian music. They commenced in 1987.

! 
|-
|1998
|  "Wickerman Shoes"
| ARIA Award for Breakthrough Artist - Single
| 
|
|-

References

Australian rock music groups